Iowa is a state located in the Midwestern United States that is divided into 99 counties and contains 62 census-designated places (CDPs). All population data is based on the 2010 census.



Census-Designated Places

See also 

List of counties in Iowa
List of unincorporated communities in Iowa

References